Nathan Daboll ( – March 9, 1818) was an American teacher who wrote the mathematics textbook most commonly used in American schools in the first half of the 19th century. During the course of his career, he also operated a popular navigation school for merchant mariners, and published a variety of almanacs during the American Revolution period.

Early years
Born in Groton, Connecticut, Daboll was the son of Nathan Daboll (born c. 1725 in East Hampton, New York; died c. 1780) and Anna Lynn (born 1724 in Groton). He had two brothers, John (born 1755) and Benjamin (1757–1848), and two sisters Susannah (born 1748) and Amy (born 1764). Daboll's father was born with the surname Dibble, but changed it to Daboll. Daboll's grandfather was born with the surname Dibble (sometimes spelled Deble).

Daboll had little formal education but mastered mathematics quickly while earning a living as a cooper.

Career
Daboll's early career was that of a teacher. He taught mathematics at the Academic School in Plainfield, Connecticut.

Because of Daboll's ability with mathematics, Samuel M. Green, an early almanac publisher in the colonies, asked Daboll to calculate almanac entries. Daboll did so, beginning in 1771, under the alias "Edmund Freebetter", before switching to publishing almanacs and registers under his own name. Almanacs were useful instruments in propaganda wars during the American Revolution. Some of Daboll's almanacs contained satirical or factual political commentary, while others didn't. For the most part, they contained common almanac material:
"lunations; eclipses of the luminaries; aspects; judgment of the weather; rising, sitting and southing of the seven stars; sun and moon's rising and sitting; festivals, and other remarkable days; courts; roads"

The textbook Daboll's schoolmaster's assistant: being a plain, practical system of arithmetic, adapted to the United States was published in 1799, and updated with Daboll's Schoolmaster's assistant, improved and enlarged being a plain practical system of arithmetic: adapted to the United States in 1814. Its popularity was based, in part, on its practicality:
"We were taught arithmetic in Daboll, then a new book, and which, being adapted to our measures of length, weight, and currency was a prodigious leap over the head of poor old Dilworth, whose rules and examples were modelled upon English customs."

Daboll was also quite notable for his maritime navigation school in New London, Connecticut where he taught navigation and nautical astronomy to as many as 1,500 seamen. In 1811, at the invitation of Commodore John Rodgers, Daboll instructed midshipmen on the frigate President. Daboll's Practical Navigator was published posthumously in 1820 by his long-time colleague Green.

Even after his death, Daboll was remembered for his mathematics. Herman Melville referred to Daboll in his 1851 novel Moby-Dick:
"I'll get the almanac and as I have heard devils can be raised with Daboll's arithmetic, I'll try my hand at raising a meaning out of these queer curvicues here with the Massachusetts calendar."

In his 1890 book The teaching and history of mathematics in the United States, mathematics historian Florian Cajori described Daboll as one of the "three great arithmeticians in America".

Personal life
Daboll married his first cousin, Elizabeth Daboll (1742–1813), around 1778. They had a daughter, Lydia (born c. 1782), and a son, also named Nathan (1780–1863). A grandson, Celadon Leeds Daboll, invented the Daboll trumpet.

Daboll died in Groton in 1818.

Works

Books
Cajori, F. (1890). The teaching and history of mathematics in the United States. Washington: Govt. Print. Off.

 
 , Internet Archives

Almanacs

Wheeler's North-American calendar, or An almanack, for the year of our Lord 1791

References

External links
Catalogue descriptions of some of Daboll's almanacs during the American Revolutionary War period

1750 births
1818 deaths
People from Groton, Connecticut
18th-century American mathematicians
19th-century American mathematicians
Schoolteachers from Connecticut
Mathematics educators
Writers from Connecticut
People of Connecticut in the American Revolution